Tiresias is a family of TrueType sans-serif typefaces that were designed with the aim of legibility by people with impaired vision at the Scientific Research Unit of Royal National Institute of Blind People in London. The font was originally designed for the RNIB by Chris Sharville of Laker Sharville Design Associates who was working with John Gill at the time.

The family includes

 Tiresias Infofont – for information labels, optimized for maximum legibility at a distance of 30–100 cm.
 Tiresias Keyfont – for labeling the tops of keys of keyboards, PIN pads, appliances, remote controls (features exaggerated punctuation marks, no descender on the J)
 Tiresias LPfont – for large-print publications. A wedge-serif design.
 Tiresias PCfont – for raster displays
 Tiresias Screenfont – for television subtitling and on-screen user interfaces
 Tiresias Signfont – a more open spacing for use on signs

In late 2007, all Tiresias fonts except Tiresias Screenfont were released under the GNU General Public License version 3 or any later version.

The Tiresias Screenfont was sold by Bitstream Inc., who in 2012 were acquired by Monotype Corporation.  The acquiring company continues to market Tiresias on its websites.

The name likely refers to Tiresias from Greek Mythology, a blind prophet of Apollo.

See also
List of typefaces

References

External links
 Debian font package

Sans-serif typefaces
Free software Unicode typefaces
Typefaces and fonts introduced in 2001